Fao Rai is a district (amphoe) of Nong Khai province, northeastern Thailand.

Geography
Neighboring districts are (from the west clockwise): Phon Phisai and Rattanawapi of Nong Khai Province; So Phisai of Bueng Kan province; Ban Muang of Sakon Nakhon province; and Ban Dung of Udon Thani province.

History
The minor district (king amphoe) was split off from Phon Phisai District on 1 April 1995.

On 15 May 2007, all 81 minor districts were upgraded to full districts. With publication in the Royal Gazette on 24 August the upgrade became official.

Administration
The district is divided into five sub-districts (tambons), which are further subdivided into 69 villages (mubans). There are no municipal (thesaban) areas. There are five tambon administrative organizations (TAO).

References

External links
amphoe.com

Fao Rai